Fantastic Furniture is an Australian owned and operated furniture retailer. It is a subsidiary of Greenlit Brands.

History
Fantastic Furniture started as a market stall at Sydney's Parklea Markets in 1989, by friends Paul Harding and Jonathan De Jong, selling outdoor furniture. Two years later, the first Fantastic Furniture public store opened at Birkenhead Point.

The following year the Fantastic Lounge Factory opened and started production of Australian made sofas and lounges for Fantastic Furniture.

In the following years, the business couldn't keep up with the demand and in 1996 it went into administration. The business was subsequently acquired by Peter Brennan, Peter Draper and Julian Tertini and underwent a restructure. Over the next few years a number of Fantastic Furniture stores opened across NSW. 

In 2006, Fantastic Furniture acquired Royal Comfort Bedding (RCB), a NSW mattress manufacturer, to produce its mattress range in Australia.

Today, Fantastic Furniture is a national chain with over 70 stores around the country. In August 2017, Fantastic Furniture partnered with CB2 x Fred Segal. In 2016, it was included in the takeover of Furniture Holdings by Steinhoff International and delisted from the Australian Securities Exchange.

Furniture and beds

Fantastic Lounge Factory
Fantastic Furniture started manufacturing Australian made sofas and lounges in 1992. Today, the Sydney-based factory is the largest manufacturer of sofas in the Southern Hemisphere and produce and deliver over 130,000 sofas and lounges each year.

Royal Comfort Bedding
In 2006, RCB joined Fantastic Holdings Limited, which gave Fantastic Furniture the ability to self-produce their entire mattress range.

Controversies
In September 2015 it was reported that dining chair design sold by Fantastic Furniture had cut off an individual's toe after being caught in the inner side of one of the chair legs.

In January 2016 Fantastic Furniture was forced by the Australian Competition & Consumer Commission (ACCC) to recall one of their metal dining chairs. The "Worx chair", which according to the Australian Furniture Association, is based on a 1934 design that has "tapering on the inside bottom of the chair legs may lead to an entrapment or laceration hazard", according to the ACCC.

References

Australian companies established in 1989
Companies based in Sydney
Companies formerly listed on the Australian Securities Exchange
Furniture retailers of Australia
Retail companies established in 1989